RSCH may refer to:

 Royal Surrey County Hospital in Guildford, England
 Royal Sussex County Hospital in Brighton, England